The Canon EOS 90D is a digital single-lens reflex (DSLR) camera announced by Canon on August 28, 2019. It has a body-only MSRP of US$1199, which is the same as the Canon EOS 80D, which it replaces. 

The camera is one of Canon's higher-end APS-C cameras and is referred to as an enthusiast model. The 90D has a new 32.5MP image sensor compared to the older 24.2MP sensor of the previous 80D model.

Features 
Compared to the EOS 80D, several modifications were made, including:

 32.5-megapixel dual-pixel CMOS sensor
 DIGIC 8 (DIGIC 6 on the 80D)
 220,000 pixel RGB+IR metering sensor to aid the AF system
 4K (2160p) at 30 fps video recording capability 
 1080p at 120/60/50 fps video recording capability
 AF joystick on rear to aid autofocus point selection
 HDMI output with 4K capability
 Spot AF function in addition to the single point AF
 10fps viewfinder shooting vs 7fps on 80D
 Supports UHS-II data transfer bus (the first Canon DSLR to support this protocol; the previously introduced EOS R and EOS RP and concurrently introduced EOS M6 Mark II)

The ability to record 24p video in either 4K or 1080p was not available until late October 2019, as a firmware update, since unlike its predecessor the 90D had been initially released without any video capabilities.

Critical Response

References 

80D
Cameras introduced in 2016
Live-preview digital cameras